Santiago Barragán Portilla (born 18 March 1987) is a Spanish motorcycle racer. He currently rides a BMW S1000RR in the FIM CEV Superbike European Championship. He has competed in the 250cc World Championship, the Superbike World Championship, the Supersport World Championship, the FIM Superstock 1000 Cup and the European Superstock 600 Championship; in 2010 he won the European Superstock 1000 Championship and the privateers' class of the CEV Stock Extreme Championship.

Career statistics

Grand Prix motorcycle racing

By season

Races by year
(key)

Supersport World Championship

Races by year
(key)

Superbike World Championship

Races by year
(key)

References

External links
 Profile on MotoGP.com
 Profile on WorldSBK.com

1987 births
People from Almendralejo
Living people
Spanish motorcycle racers
250cc World Championship riders
Supersport World Championship riders
Superbike World Championship riders
FIM Superstock 1000 Cup riders